Charles William Bradford (born July 25, 1944) is an American former professional baseball player. He played as an outfielder in Major League Baseball  for the Chicago White Sox (1966–70, 1972–75 and 1976), Cleveland Indians (1970–71), Cincinnati Reds (1971) and St. Louis Cardinals (1975). He also played one season for the Kintetsu Buffaloes (1977) in Japan.

Bradford was born in Mobile, Alabama. He was traded along with Tommie Sisk from the White Sox to the Indians for Bob Miller and Barry Moore before the trade deadline on June 15, 1970. He was dealt along with Greg Terlecky from the Cardinals to the White Sox for Lee Richard on December 12, 1975. After winning a starting position for the White Sox in 1976, he was released later in the season after a poor offensive output.

In eleven MLB seasons, he played in 697 games, had 1,605 at-bats, 224 runs, 363 hits, 50 doubles, 8 triples, 52 home runs, 175 RBI, 36 stolen bases, 184 walks, .226 batting average, .311 on-base percentage, .364 slugging percentage, 585 total bases, 12 sacrifice hits, 11 sacrifice flies and 16 intentional walks. He had a strong arm and was a solid outfielder, although he never won a Gold Glove Award.

References

External links

Pura Pelota (Venezuelan Winter League)

1944 births
Living people
African-American baseball players
American expatriate baseball players in Japan
Baseball players from Alabama
Chicago White Sox players
Cincinnati Reds players
Cleveland Indians players
Clinton C-Sox players
Evansville White Sox players
Florida Instructional League White Sox players
Indianapolis Indians players
Iowa Oaks players
Kintetsu Buffaloes players
Lynchburg White Sox players
Major League Baseball outfielders
Navegantes del Magallanes players
American expatriate baseball players in Venezuela
Sarasota Sun Sox players
Sportspeople from Mobile, Alabama
St. Louis Cardinals players
Tidewater Tides players
Tucson Toros players
21st-century African-American people
20th-century African-American sportspeople
San Fernando High School alumni